Doris Miller (1919–1943) was a U.S. Navy sailor, awarded the Navy Cross for actions at Pearl Harbor in WWII.

Doris Miller may also refer to:

People
 Doris K. Miller or Doris Koteen Seldin (1922–2015), U.S. psychologist and peace activist
 Dóris Monteiro or Doris Miller (born 1934), Brazilian singer
 Doris Miller, co-owner of radio station KSMM in Liberal, Kansas

Characters
 Doris Miller, a character from the film Damn Yankees
 Doris Miller, a character from the film Hello, My Name Is Doris

Other uses
 USS Doris Miller, a planned Gerald R. Ford-class U.S. Navy aircraft carrier
 Doris Miller Auditorium, an auditorium in Rosewood Park, Austin, Texas
 Doris Miller Theatre, a theatre in Naval Station Treasure Island, San Francisco, California
 Doris Miller Middle School, a school in San Marcos, Texas

See also

 Doris (disambiguation)
 Miller (disambiguation)
 USS Miller (FF-1091), a U.S. Navy frigate named after "Dorie" Miller
 Doris Miller Memorial, a public art installation in Waco, Texas

Miller, Doris